NAD Electronics is a brand name of an electronics firm whose products include home hi-fi amplifiers and related components. NAD is an abbreviation for New Acoustic Dimension.

The company was founded in London, England, in 1972 by Dr. Martin L. Borish, an electrical engineer with a PhD in physics. Its most famous product is the late-1970s NAD 3020, an integrated amplifier designed by Bjørn Erik Edvardsen, which was highly regarded by various magazines in Britain.

NAD's philosophy is to include only genuinely useful features for aesthetically understated designs when compared to other competitors' products. NAD was one of the first audio manufacturers to outsource the manufacturing of its products to electronics factories in east Asia.

NAD was acquired by the Danish firm AudioNord in 1991 and subsequently sold in 1999 to the Lenbrook Group of Pickering, Ontario, Canada.

Power-supply design 
NAD focuses on the concept of "effective power" and its amplifiers make claims to deliver generous headroom, meaning that they may be able to deliver dynamic power bursts far in excess of their rated RMS power. The key to this feature requires use of a flexible power supply which stores significant reserve current for quick release at moments of high musical load. Originally developed at NAD by Phill Marshall, the various incarnations of this design have been associated with different names over the years including Power Envelope and recently PowerDrive.

Additional benefits of this approach include the fact that amplifiers using this technology can handle complex, real-life, lower-impedance loudspeaker loads as compared with the simple 8-ohm resistor typically used to calculate advertised power ratings and the fact that the circuitry in this approach requires less cooling, while maintaining ability to handle complex impedance loads as low as 2 ohms.

NAD Technology in Bluesound 
Two Bluesound products, Pulse and Powernode, feature NAD direct digital technology.
It's also integrated in their line of receivers, such as the NAD 758v3 and NAD 777v3.

See also
 List of phonograph manufacturers

References

External links 

 NAD website
 Bluesound website

Electronics companies established in 1972
Audio equipment manufacturers of Canada
Audio amplifier manufacturers
Compact Disc player manufacturers
Companies based in Ontario
Pickering, Ontario
Loudspeaker manufacturers
Phonograph manufacturers
British brands
Canadian brands
1972 establishments in England